Swartz is a German surname related to the German word Schwarz. It may refer to:

 Aaron Swartz (1986–2013), American computer programmer and activist
 Aaron Swartz (actor), English actor and director
 Arthur L. Swartz (1888–1940), New York politician
 Beth Ames Swartz (born 1936), American artist
 Bud Swartz (1929–1991), American professional baseball pitcher
 Carl Swartz (1858–1926), Swedish politician 
 Charles S. Swartz (1939–2007), American filmmaker, researcher and academic
 Clarence Lee Swartz (1868–1936), American individualist anarchist
 Dan Swartz (1931–1997) American basketball player
 Edvard Swartz (1826–1897), Swedish actor
 George Swartz (1928–2006), South African religious leader, Bishop of Kimberley and Kuruman
 Harry Swartz (born 1996), American soccer player
 Harvie S (born 1948), stage name of American jazz double-bassist Harvie Swartz
 Jeffrey Swartz (born 1960), American businessman, former CEO of Timberland
 Jerome Swartz (born 1940), American physicist
 Joshua William Swartz (1867–1959), American politician congressman
 Kit Swartz, American television news producer
 Marc Swartz (1931–2011), American political and cultural anthropologist
 Maud O'Farrell Swartz (1879-1937), American labor leader
 Merlin Swartz (born 1933), American Islamic Studies professor
 Monty Swartz (1897–1980), American professional baseball pitcher
 Norman Swartz (born 1939), American academic and philosopher
 Olof Swartz (1760–1818), Swedish biologist
 Oscar Swartz (born 1959), Swedish entrepreneur, writer and blogger
 Oswald Swartz (born 1953), South African religious leader, Bishop of Kimberley and Kuruman
 Reginald Swartz (1911–2006), Australian politician
 Roberta Teale Swartz (1903–1993), American academic and poet
 Shane Swartz (born 1975),  American boxer
 Tenille Swartz (born 1987), South African squash player
 Tony Swartz (born 1943), American actor

Swedish-language surnames
Surnames from nicknames